Eldon Rasmussen (7 July 1936 – 5 June 2022) was a Canadian driver in the USAC Championship Car series. He raced in the 1971 and 1973–1979 seasons, with 23 career starts, including the 1975, 1977, and 1979 Indianapolis 500.

Career
Rasmussen was born in Standard, Alberta, on July 7, 1936. In lap 125 of the 1975 race Tom Sneva, attempting to lap Rasmussen, ran over his left front wheel and was launched into the Turn 2 wall, exploding and disintegrating before tumbling to a stop.  The spectacular nature of the accident, and the fact that Sneva escaped serious injury, have led to its being replayed on television.

In his Champcar career, Rasmussen finished in the top ten 3 times, with a best finish in 7th position in 1975 at the Ontario Motor Speedway in Ontario, California. He built his own race chassis which he dubbed the "Rascar" which he campaigned with limited success from 1973 to 1979. In all 3 of his Indy starts, Rasmussen qualified his Rascar on the last row.

Eldon Rasmussen was a fabricator of race parts in Indianapolis for years and was inducted into the Canadian Motorsport Hall of Fame.

Indianapolis 500 results

Notes

See also

List of Canadians in Champ Car

External links
Driver Database Profile

1936 births
2022 deaths
Canadian people of Danish descent
Indianapolis 500 drivers
Racing drivers from Alberta
Sportspeople from Edmonton